Willi Knesebeck (31 March 1887 – 18 September 1956) was a German international footballer.

References

1887 births
1956 deaths
Association football midfielders
German footballers
Germany international footballers
Hertha BSC managers
German football managers